Narayanpur or Narayanapur may refer to:

India

Bihar 
Narayanpur, Bhojpur district
Narayanpur, Darbhanga district
 Narayanpur, Jagdishpur district
 Narayanpur, Saran district
Narayanpur, Manjhi block
Narayanpur (234040), in Parsa block
Narayanpur (234060), in Parsa block
Narayanpur, Taraiya block

Uttar Pradesh 

Narayanpur, Dih, Raebareli, Uttar Pradesh
 Narayanpur, Maharajganj, Raebareli, Uttar Pradesh
 Narayanpur, Shivgarh, Uttar Pradesh
 Narayanpur, Unchahar, Uttar Pradesh

Other states 
Narayanpur, Assam
 Narayanpur, Chhattisgarh
Narayanpur district, Chhattisgarh
 Narayanpur, Kashmir, Jammu district, Jammu & Kashmir
Narayanpur, Jamtara district, Jharkhand
 Narayanpur block, an administrative division in Jamtara district, Jharkhand
Narayanpur, Karnataka
 Narayanapur, Bidar, Bidar district, Karnataka
 Narayanpur, Pune, Maharashtra
 Narayanapur, Nalgonda, Bhuvanagiri district, Telangana
 Narayanapur, Ranga Reddy, Telangana
 Narayanpur, Namkhana, South 24 Parganas district, West Bengal
 Narayanpur, Purba Bardhaman, West Bengal

Nepal
 Narayanpur, Sarlahi, Janakpur
 Narayanpur, Chitwan, Narayani
 Narayanpur, Rapti, Lumbini Province
 Narayanpur, Kailali, Sudurpashchim Pradesh

Other uses
 Narayanpur (Vidhan Sabha constituency), a legislative assembly constituency of Chhattisgarh state in India
 Basava Sagara, previously known as Narayanpur Dam, across the Krishna River in Karnataka State, India

See also
 
 
 Narainpur (disambiguation)
 Narayanpur Bad, Uttar Pradesh, India
 Narayanapura, Karnataka, India
 Narayanapuram (disambiguation)